Przybrodzin  (German 1939–1945 Imsee) is a village in the administrative district of Gmina Powidz, within Słupca County, Greater Poland Voivodeship, in west-central Poland.

References

Przybrodzin